Even Shmuel (lit. Stone of Samuel) is a religious Zionist village in southern Israel. Located around four kilometres south of Kiryat Gat, it falls under the jurisdiction of Shafir Regional Council.

History
The village was established in 1956 under the name Uman, and was later renamed in honour of the Jewish Canadian philanthropist Samuel Bronfman.

The village was originally founded as an agricultural moshav.  In 2013, the village population expanded eastward, converting agricultural lands into a residential neighborhood of an additional 280 households.

References

External links
 Village website 

Villages in Israel
Religious Israeli communities
Populated places established in 1956
Populated places in Southern District (Israel)
1956 establishments in Israel